is a railway station located in the city of Aomori, Aomori Prefecture, Japan, operated by the East Japan Railway Company (JR East).

Lines

Station layout
The station has one side platform and one island platform serving three tracks, connected to the station building by a footbridge. The station has a Midori no Madoguchi staffed ticket office.

Platforms

Route bus
Aomori municipal Bus
For Aomori Station via Daishaka and Shinjō
For Aomori Station via Aomori Airport
Konan Bus
For Kuroishi Station via Hongō
For Kuroishi Station via Tobinai and Mayajiri

History
Namioka Station was opened on 7 December 1894 as a station on the Japanese Government Railway, the predecessor to the Japanese National Railways (JNR) in former Namioka village. With the privatization of the JNR on 1 April 1987, it came under the operational control of JR East. A new station building was completed in November 2009.

Passenger statistics
In fiscal 2018, the station was used by an average of 942 passengers daily (boarding passengers only).

Surrounding area
Namioka post office

Aomori city hall Namioka office
Namioka onsen

See also
List of railway stations in Japan

References

External links

 

Stations of East Japan Railway Company
Railway stations in Aomori Prefecture
Ōu Main Line
Railway stations in Japan opened in 1894
Aomori (city)